Sheykh Mahalleh (also Romanized as Sheykh Maḩalleh and Shaikh Mahalleh; also known as Sheikh-Makhallekh) is a village in Saheli-ye Jokandan Rural District, in the Central District of Talesh County, Gilan Province, Iran. At the 2006 census, its population was 776, in 176 families.

References 

Populated places in Talesh County